Regula Aebi (married Anliker; born 12 November 1965) is a Swiss sprinter. She represented her country in 200 metres at the 1988 Summer Olympics reaching the semifinals. In addition, she won the silver medal over the same distance at the 1989 European Indoor Championships.

International competitions

1Did not start in the semifinals

Personal bests
Outdoors
100 metres – 11.59 (+0.1 m/s, Lausanne 1989)
200 metres – 22.88 (-0.4 m/s, Zug 1988)
400 metres – 56.70 (Lausanne 1985)
Indoors
200 metres – 23.26 (Magglingen 1990)

References

All-Athletics profile

1965 births
Living people
Swiss female sprinters
Athletes (track and field) at the 1988 Summer Olympics
Olympic athletes of Switzerland
Olympic female sprinters